Cibuyo (Asturian: Cibuyu) is one of the 54 parishes in Cangas del Narcea, a municipality within the province and autonomous community of Asturias, in northern Spain.  It has 316 inhabitants and sits at an elevation of 580 m.

Villages
 Arbolente
 Cibuyu
 Folgueirúa
 Las Frauguas
 Outás
 Saburciu
 San Esteba
 Soutu
 Veiga'l Castru

References

Parishes in Cangas del Narcea